The Tsege language, Tchitchege, is a member of the Teke dialect continuum of the western Congo Basin.

References

Teke languages